Tughlaq Durbar  is a 2021 Indian Tamil-language political satire film written and directed by Delhi Prasad Deenadayalan, on his directional debut, with screenplay and dialogues written by Balaji Tharaneetharan. The film stars Vijay Sethupathi, Raashii Khanna, R. Parthiban, Manjima Mohan, Karunakaran, Bagavathi Perumal and Rajkumar. The music of the film is composed by Govind Vasantha, with Manoj Paramahamsa and Mahendiran Jayaraju handling the cinematography and R. Govindaraj edited the film.

The film had a direct-to-television premiere on Sun TV during Ganesh Chaturthi (10 September 2021) and released on Netflix, the following day to mixed reviews.

Plot 

In 1986, Rayappan, a Tamil Nadu MLA of the ruling party, is delivering a speech at J.K. Nagar, an impoverished suburb in Chennai, where one of the attendants, a pregnant woman, goes into labour. As a publicity stunt for creating sympathy, Rayappan orders his men to help the woman by lending their dhotis. The woman gives birth to a boy, whom Rayappan christens as Singaravelan, or "Singam" on the stage. Singam grows up as an orphan as his mother had died shortly after the birth of his younger sister, Manimegalai, followed by the death of his father due to overdrinking. Singam's relationship with Manimegalai is quite fraught and strained as the former blames her for their parents death and the latter disapproves of the former's obsession towards Rayappan, for whom he even sold her mother's only nosepiece for party promotions. This led them to not be on talking terms for 20 years.

In 2021, Rayappan, now a powerful and influential politician, begins scouting for a suitable candidate to work as a councillor for J.K. Nagar. Vying for attention, Singam strives to seek Rayappan's consideration by performing a media stunt by drinking poison in front of press during Rayappan's arrest and gains his trust, much to the irritation and dismay of Mangalam, Rayappan's right-hand man, who is also vying for the position. Singam manages to emerge as Rayappan's favorite within a short span of time by employing hilarious techniques and his friend Vasu's ideas. Frustrated at being sidelined, an infuriated Mangalam brandishes a bottle at Singam's head; he is subsequently expelled from the ruling party for his ruthless behavior.

Shortly after the incident, Singam develops an alter ego, presumably from his injuries who does quite the opposite of Singam's doings. The next day he gets nominated for the counsellor chair, but beforehand, Rayappan asks for 50 lakhs as a deposit for his post, which he got from duping Kamatchi, a wealthy daughter of a moneylending businessman who Singam initially kidnapped with Vasu as a pawn for extorting money from her father with the help of Vasu's hired goons, only to be saved by his alter ego who first resurfaces by thrashing the goons and saving her. During elections, both Singam and Mangalam try various corrupt tricks to lure the voters and increase their vote bank. Initially, Singam is lagging behind in public opinion and votes due to the lack of money power but manages to gamble on the sympathy by intentionally carrying a pregnant woman Shanti in front of the people to gain voters recognition and trust of the people, much to the horror and dismay of Vasu, but Singam ultimately beats Mangalam to become the new counsellor of J.K Nagar.

Now enters Damayanthi and Mayor into the fray, who run an illegal construction and money laundering firm for corporate companies under the pretext of NGO named Aashirvaad Foundation. They initially sign a contract with Singam under Rayappan as a mediator for evacuation and demolition of J.K Nagar and offer 50 crores as advance as a bribe. But in the wake of the night, Singam's alter ego again resurfaces and leaks the document to media framing Rayappan, Singam and the ruling party under corruption case. An agitated Rayappan calls for an urgent party meeting to catch the culprit but is shocked to see the vigilante masked in CCTV. He then orders Singam to check the whereabouts of the money hideout, only to find the mask used by the vigilante in there. Now begins the cat and mouse game between Singam and vigilante Singam who flunks out what corrupt Singam's plans to do using various tactics and even causes a distrust with Vasu, who leaves him after seeing his evil intentions and Rayappan questioning his loyalty.

Finally, after getting convinced by the evidence found against Singam, Rayappan deduces that Singam is the masked vigilante who has conked all his wrongdoings and orders his henchmen to abduct him, only to be caught red-handed by the income tax department while exchanging money due to the intelligence of the vigilante Singam. After investigations, it is found that Singam handed over only 1/5th of the money. After being bailed out by Kamatchi, who comes across the truth about him and breaks up with him angrily for playing with her emotions. Meanwhile, an angry and denounced Rayappan orders his henchmen to kill Singam in his own area as a statement for betrayal, only to be saved by Lakshmi (whose pregnancy Singam gambled with for vote) and his area people, but not before passing out due to fatal injuries sustained.

In the hospital, Singam realizes his folly for betraying trust of his people against their love they showered over him over the years and inspired by Vasu and the final video recording of his alter ego in which he reveals the hideout of remaining money through Vasu, he reconciles with Manimegalai after thrashing her pervert boss who sexually abused many women thereby shaving is head in public and slowly regains his reputation to emerge as the people's favorite MLA candidate in upcoming state elections by performing his duties with the money he stoved away. Fearing his defeat certain and fumed with rage about loss, Rayappan kidnaps J.K Nagar's 40 children to extract the remaining 40 crores from Singam to avenge his loss only to be exposed to media about his atrocities to public and CM, who orders Rayappan to drop his plans not before sacking him from party and issuing orders to arrest Damayanti. In the meeting with CM Nagarajan Chozlan aka Ammavasa, Singam quickly cements his place as CM's right-hand man and becomes J.K Nagar's MLA by playing in the same manner he did with Rayappan, much to the shock and belief of Vasu, who again questions his personality, to which Singam replies there is always a need for a perfect mix of good and evil to sustain in politics.

Cast

Production 
Producer S. S. Lalit Kumar, who distributed Vijay Sethupathi's '96 had announced his foray into film production with Sethupathi being cast in the leading role. At the special event to commodate the success of '96, Lalit announced their project being tentatively titled as Thuglak and will be helmed by debutant film maker Delhi Prasad Deenadayalan, an assistant of Balaji Tharaneetharan. Prasad in his interaction with The Times of India, stated the film is an "out-and-out mass subject", but still a "sensible film". He further revealed that Vijay Sethupathi will play a role of a politician, whose character will have "interesting shades" and an "element of fantasy woven into it". Tharaneetharan was roped in to write the screenplay and dialogues, whereas Govind Vasantha who earlier collaborated with Sethupathi in 96 took charge of composing the music.

The film was launched on 3 August 2019 with Parthiban, Aditi Rao Hydari, Gayathrie and Manjima Mohan were announced as the pivotal characters. Lalit Kumar announced through Twitter in May 2020 that 35 days of shooting was completed before the COVID-19 lockdown in India, with 40 more days of shoot pending. Hydari later opted out of the project citing schedule conflicts, and Raashi Khanna was selected to replace her in October 2020, marking Khanna's second collaboration with Sethupathi, after Sangathamizhan. Samyuktha Karthik of Bigg Boss fame was announced as a new addition to the film's cast in December 2020. The shooting of the film was wrapped on 7 January 2021 and the team began post-production.

Music 

The film's soundtrack and background score is composed by Govind Vasantha, and the album featured four songs with lyrics written by Karthik Netha and Madhan Karky. The first single from the film titled "Annathe Sethi" which had lyrics written by Karthik Netha and sung by Arivu, was released by Think Music on 28 September 2020. A reviewer from The Times of India, called it as a "spirited political revolutionary song", and Karthik Srinivasan of Milliblog said that "The song wears its 'revolutionary sound' up-front, but Govind's music is pulsating and very catchy, particularly when the chorus joins Arivu's rousing singing."

A year later, the entire soundtrack album was released on 2 September 2021. The album opened to positive reviews from critics, with Ramya Palisetty of India Today describing the soundtrack as "compelling", and Vipin Nair of Music Aloud said that "Govind had delivered eclectic tunes with fusing beats" and rated 3 out of 5 to the album.

Release 
The film was initially scheduled for theatrical release in 2020, but was postponed due to the COVID-19 pandemic. The film premiered directly through Sun TV on 10 September 2021, coinciding with the occasion of Ganesh Chaturthi, and was streamed on Netflix the following days.

Reception 
The film opened up with mixed reviews from both critics and audiences. To praise for the acting of Vijay Sethupathi, and Parthiban and the comically delivered dialogues. Baradwaj Rangan of Film Companion South wrote "The second half seems all over the place, like little scenes stitched together instead of one integral, organic screenplay. The ending is funny in a certain way but it also doesn't fit in with the rest of the film. It might work as a standalone scene, but like the rest of the film, it needed far better writing and conceptualization."

References

External links 
 

2021 drama films
2020s political drama films
2021 directorial debut films
2021 films
2021 television films
Film productions suspended due to the COVID-19 pandemic
Films not released in theaters due to the COVID-19 pandemic
Films postponed due to the COVID-19 pandemic
Films scored by Govind Menon
Films shot in Chennai
Indian political drama films
Indian television films
2020s Tamil-language films